Glyphodes serenalis is a subspecies of moth in the family Crambidae. It was described by Snellen in 1880. It is found on Sulawesi.

References

Moths described in 1880
Glyphodes